Antony Gibbs (sometimes credited as Tony Gibbs;  17 October 1925 – 26 February 2016) was an English film and television editor with more than 40 feature film credits. He was a member of the American Cinema Editors (ACE).

Career
Gibbs' editing career began in the mid-1950s as an assistant to Ralph Kemplen and to Alan Osbiston, and through them he became involved with the brief "New Wave" of British filmmaking at its beginnings. In particular Osbiston (and Gibbs) edited The Entertainer (1960), which was directed by Tony Richardson; Richardson was one of the most prominent of the British New Wave directors. Gibbs was then principal editor for several of the subsequent "New Wave" films, including Richardson's A Taste of Honey (1961), The Loneliness of the Long Distance Runner (1962), and Tom Jones (1963), and also The Knack ...and How to Get It (1965), which was directed by Richard Lester.

In his 1995 book, Film and Video Editing, Roger Crittenden notes the influence of this first phase of Gibbs' editing career, "The generation of American editors of which Dede Allen is a part has given considerable credit for the inspiration of their work to Antony Gibbs, the English editor of films directed by, amongst others, Tony Richardson, Nicholas Roeg, and Richard Lester. There is a daring and energetic quality to Tony Gibbs' work, especially in some sequences of The Loneliness of the Long Distance Runner, Tom Jones, The Knack, and Performance, which must have given a shot of adrenaline to aspiring editors on both sides of the Atlantic at the time. Dede ascribes her work on Bonnie and Clyde directly to the influence of Tony Gibbs." Bonnie and Clyde (1967) "marked a turning point in the editing of feature films that sent reverberations through the entire American cinema."

Gibbs was the "supervising editor" for Richardson's 1965 film, The Loved One, that was produced in Hollywood. Gibbs relocated from England to California in about 1970. From 1971–1989 he had an extended collaboration with Norman Jewison that commenced with the well-received Fiddler on the Roof (1971) and ultimately extended over five films. Gibbs retired from filmmaking in 2001.

Gibbs' editing of Tom Jones (1962) was nominated for an American Cinema Editors Eddie award. Tom Jones won the Academy Award for Best Picture, and Richardson received the Academy Award for Best Director for it. Subsequent to his "New Wave" films, Gibbs was nominated four times for the BAFTA Award for Best Editing, for the films Performance (directed by Donald Cammell & Nicolas Roeg-1970), Fiddler on the Roof (Jewison-1971), Rollerball (Jewison-1975), and A Bridge Too Far (Attenborough-1975). Gibbs has never been nominated for the Academy Award for Best Editing. Gibbs was nominated again for ACE Eddie awards for Fiddler on the Roof and, much later in his career, he won Eddie awards for the television films George Wallace (Part II) (1997) and for James Dean (2001). Gibbs had been elected to membership in the American Cinema Editors, and was the recipient of the American Cinema Editors Career Achievement Award in 2002.

Gibbs died on 26 February 2016 at the age of 90.

Filmography as editor
This filmography is based on the internet movie database; the director and release date for each film are indicated in parentheses.
 James Dean (Rydell-2001) (TV)
 Reindeer Games (Frankenheimer-2000)
 Ronin (Frankenheimer-1998) (as Tony Gibbs)
 George Wallace (Frankenheimer-1997) (TV)
 Crime of the Century (Rydell-1996) (TV)
 A Case for Life (Laneuville-1996) (TV)
 Don Juan DeMarco (Leven-1994) (as Tony Gibbs)
 The Man Without a Face (Gibson-1993) (as Tony Gibbs)
 Devlin (Rosenthal-1992) (TV)
 The Taking of Beverly Hills (Furie-1991)
 In Country (Jewison-1989) (with Lou Lombardo)
 Stealing Home (Kampmann, Porter-1988)
 Russkies (Rosenthal-1987)
 Tai-Pan (Duke-1986)
 Agnes of God (Jewison-1985)
 Dune (Lynch-1984)
 Bad Boys (Rosenthal-1983)
  (Zanussi-1981) (with Paolo Fabbri and Waldemar Król)
 The Dogs of War (Irvin-1980)
 The Wildcats of St Trinian's (Launder-1980)
 Yesterday's Hero (Leifer-1979)
 A Bridge Too Far (Attenborough-1977)
 The Sailor Who Fell from Grace with the Sea (Carlino-1976)
 Rollerball (Jewison-1975)
 Juggernaut (Lester-1974)
 The Black Windmill (Siegel-1974)
 Jesus Christ Superstar (Jewison-1973)
 The Ragman's Daughter (Becker-1972)
 Fiddler on the Roof (Jewison-1971) (with Robert Lawrence)
 Walkabout (Roeg-1971)
 Shangani Patrol (David Millin-1970)
 Performance (Cammell & Roeg-1970)
 The Birthday Party (Friedkin-1968)
 Petulia (Lester-1968)
 The Sailor from Gibraltar (Richardson-1967) (as Anthony Gibbs)
 Mademoiselle (Richardson-1966) (as Anthony Gibbs)
 The Knack …and How to Get It (Lester-1965)
 The Loved One (Richardson-1965) (supervising editor; with Hal Ashby and Brian Smedley-Aston)
 The Luck of Ginger Coffey (Kershner-1964)
 Girl with Green Eyes (Davis-1964) (uncredited)
 Tom Jones (Richardson-1963)
 The Loneliness of the Long Distance Runner (Richardson-1962)
 Tiara Tahiti (Kotcheff-1962)
 During One Night (Furie), 1961)
 A Taste of Honey (Richardson-1961)
 The Snake Woman (Furie-1961)
 Doctor Blood's Coffin (Furie-1961)
 Offbeat (Owen-1961)
 Oscar Wilde (Ratoff-1960)
 The Unstoppable Man (Bishop-1960) (as Anthony Gibbs)

See also
List of film director and editor collaborations

Notes

References

External links

American Cinema Editors
British film editors
1925 births
Place of birth missing
2016 deaths